Geodia apiarium is a species of sea sponge in the family Geodiidae. It is found in the Gulf of Mexico off the coast of Florida.

References

Bibliography 
 Schmidt, O. (1870). Grundzüge einer Spongien-Fauna des atlantischen Gebietes. (Wilhelm Engelmann: Leipzig): iii-iv, 1-88, pls I-VI.

Tetractinellida
Sponges described in 1870